is a town located in Chiba Prefecture, Japan. , the town had an estimated population of 12,494 in 5643 households and a population density of 540 persons per km².

Geography
Ichinomiya is located in the eastern part of Chiba prefecture, about 35 kilometers from the prefectural capital at Chiba and 60 to 70 kilometers from central Tokyo.

The highest elevations in the town are at Mount Shiroyama , a former castle site, Mount Takafuji , and Mount Gundari .

Neighboring municipalities
Chiba Prefecture
Isumi
Chōsei
Mutsuzawa

Climate
Ichinomiya has a humid subtropical climate (Köppen Cfa) characterized by warm summers and cool winters with light to no snowfall.  The average annual temperature in Ichinomiya is 15.4 °C. The average annual rainfall is 1717 mm with September as the wettest month. The temperatures are highest on average in August, at around 26.0 °C, and lowest in January, at around 5.8 °C.

Demographics
Per Japanese census data, the population of Ichinomiya remained relatively steady over the past 70 years.

History
The area of present-day Ichinomiya has been inhabited since prehistoric times. The area takes its name from the Tamasaki Shrine, the Ichinomiya, or first shrine of Kazusa Province. During the Sengoku period, the Satomi clan, the virtually independent rulers of the Bōsō Peninsula, established a castle at Ichinomiya. The area was devastated by the 1703 Genroku earthquake, during which a tsunami extended 1.5 kilometers inland from the coast. During the Edo period, a 13,000 koku feudal domain called Ichinomiya Domain ruled the area. After the start of the Meiji period, the area rapidly developed as a summer health resort, with many noted politicians, military figures, artists and writers establishing summer residences. Ichinomiya Town was created within Chōsei District with the establishment of the modern municipalities system on April 1, 1889.  Ichinomiya merged with the neighboring village of Torami on November 3, 1953.

Government
Ichinomiya has a mayor-council form of government with a directly elected mayor and a unicameral town council of 13 members. Together with the other municipalities in Chōsei District, Ichinomiya contributes one member to the Chiba Prefectural Assembly. In terms of national politics, the town is part of Chiba 11th district of the lower house of the Diet of Japan.

Economy
The primary industry of Ichinomiya is specialized agriculture, with concentration on tomato, melons and fruits. The tourist and resort industry is also a major component of the local economy. The town is also located within the Minami Kantō gas field, and extraction of natural gas contributes to the local economy.

Education
Ichinomiya has two public elementary schools and one public middle school operated by the town government. The town has one public high school operated by the Chiba Prefecture Board of Education. The prefectural also operates one special education school for the handicapped.

Transportation

Railway
 JR East – Sotobo Line
 -

Highway
Kujukuri Toll Road
  to Togane or Tateyama

Local attractions
Kujūkuri Beach
Tamasaki Jinja

References

External links
Official Website 
ichinomiya Tourism Association 
Visit Ichinomiya

Towns in Chiba Prefecture
Populated coastal places in Japan
Populated places established in 1953
1953 establishments in Japan
Ichinomiya, Chiba